The Critic is a monthly British political and cultural magazine. Contributors include David Starkey, Joshua Rozenberg, Peter Hitchens and Toby Young.

The magazine was founded in November 2019, with Michael Mosbacher, former editor of Standpoint, and Christopher Montgomery, a strategist with the European Research Group of Eurosceptic Tory MPs, as co-editors. It was funded by Jeremy Hosking, a Conservative party donor who had previously donated to Standpoint.

Reception 
Mosbacher described The Critic as competing with Standpoint. Mosbacher said that Hosking had been unwilling to fund Standpoint without more of "the culture wars content" that interested him, but Standpoint board resisted this direction. The Times Literary Supplement described The Critic as having a resemblance to The Spectator, with a mission "to criticize the critics". Ian Burrell of The Drum called The Critic a "contrarian conservative magazine". 

In his essay wishing success for the new publication, David Goodhart, founder of Prospect, remarked "Does the world need another magazine of tastefully written… conservatively inclined thinking? Probably not." Peter Wilby of the New Statesman responded "I would say probably yes, so why do we never get one?"

References

External links
 

2019 establishments in the United Kingdom
Cultural magazines published in the United Kingdom
Magazines published in London
Monthly magazines published in the United Kingdom
News magazines published in the United Kingdom
Political magazines published in the United Kingdom
Magazines established in 2019